Interstate 35 (I-35) is a north–south Interstate Highway that stretches from Laredo, Texas, to Duluth, Minnesota. In the US state of Minnesota, I-35 enters from Iowa and heads north toward the twin cities of Minneapolis and Saint Paul. South of the metropolitan area, I-35 splits into two branches; I-35E runs through Saint Paul and I-35W through Minneapolis. These two branches rejoin north of the Twin Cities, and the highway continues north to Duluth, where it terminates at State Highway 61 (MN 61). The highway was authorized in 1956 and the first segment opened in 1958. It reached Duluth in 1971, and the final segment to east Duluth opened in 1992.

Route description
I-35 enters the state from Iowa near Albert Lea. It heads roughly due north toward the Twin Cities, where it splits into I-35E and I-35W. The two halves of I-35 rejoin north of the Twin Cities. From there, I-35 travels north-northeast; south of Duluth, it becomes more northeasterly. The route ends near the shore of Lake Superior in Duluth. The entire route is officially designated the Red Bull Highway, named after the 34th Infantry (Red Bull) Division. Legally, I-35 is defined as Routes 390, 395, and 396 in the Minnesota Statutes §161.12(2), but the route is not marked with those numbers. The I-35 legislative route designation and mileposts follow I-35E in the Twin Cities area.

Southern segment
I-35 enters the state in Freeborn County south of Albert Lea. The first  northbound contains a rest area and Minnesota welcome center. Shortly after the first exit, for County Road 5 (CR 5), there is a sweeping S-curve to the northwest and back to the north. The exit for CR 13 marks the last exit before Albert Lea. Up to here, the Interstate roughly marked the halfway point between U.S. Route 65 (US 65) and US 69. Both U.S. Highways end in Albert Lea.

In Albert Lea, it curves to the northeast and meets US 65, which passes beneath the Interstate. US 65 picks up Business Loop Interstate 35 (BL I-35), which follows the US Highway through the city. It then crosses Albert Lea Lake of a pair of  bridges. It straightens back to the north to meet CR 46, which follows the former route of US 16. Shortly after that interchange, it intersects the national northern end of US 65; access to US 65 there is limited to the southbound lanes of I-35, and traffic from US 65 can only access the northbound lanes of I-35. At the northeastern edge of Albert Lea, there is an interchange with I-90, which directs traffic toward La Crosse, Wisconsin, or Sioux Falls, South Dakota.

I-35 continues north through the rolling hills of southern Minnesota. At Clarks Grove, it intersects MN 251. Between there and the CR 35 exit to Geneva, it passes to the west of Geneva Lake. Just east of Ellendale is an interchange with MN 30. Exit 32, CR 4 to Hope, is the last interchange before Owatonna. On the southern edge of Owatonna is a cloverleaf interchange with US 14. North of CR 45, the CR 34 exit serves northern Owatonna and provides access to the Owatonna Degner Regional Airport. The CR 9 exit serves Clinton Falls and a Cabela's store.

Further north, I-35 meets CR 12 and CR 23 in Medford. Along CR 23, which serves as a western frontage road to I-35, lies an outlet mall. Now in Rice County, the Interstate approaches Faribault. Exit 55 only serves exiting northbound traffic and entering southbound traffic. MN 60 is the main east–west street through Faribault, and MN 21 provides access to Faribault from the north of town. To the south, MN 21 ends at MN 60, but the road continues south and reconnects to I-35 at exit 55.

North of Faribault, the Interstate heads due north before the two directions are briefly separated when they enter a corridor of trees. It briefly enters Scott County where it meets CR 2 near Elko New Market. It then enters Dakota County and the Minneapolis–St. Paul metropolitan area.

In southwestern Lakeville, there is a folded diamond interchange with CR 70. Right before a partial cloverleaf interchange with CR 60, the Interstate crosses Marion Lake. Shortly after an interchange with CR 5 and CR 50, there is a park and ride complex on the northbound side of the Interstate. An entrance and exit ramp provide access to the Interstate while two entrances from Kendrick Avenue, a frontage road, provide non-Interstate access to the complex. After the CR 46 interchange, the Interstate enters Burnsville. A half diamond interchange, with only northbound exit and southbound entrance ramps, immediately precedes the split. I-35 splits into I-35W and I-35E (signed for Minneapolis and Saint Paul, respectively).

Northern segment
I-35W and I-35E join again at Columbus, near Forest Lake. The route then continues as I-35. In contrast to the rolling terrain of I-35 south of the Twin Cities area, this region is quite flat. This is the Anoka Sand Plain, an area that was formed by outwash under the last glaciers that lay over this area as they melted. This is an extensive region that continues north for another . The urban sprawl of the northern Twin Cities continues along I-35 to North Branch.

In Pine City and Hinckley, there are museums near I-35: the Pine City one at a refurbished fur trading post and interpretive center and the Hinckley one commemorating the Great Hinckley Forest Fire that occurred in 1894. Motorists who take BL I-35 through Pine City can experience a quintessential all-American main street.

Between Sandstone and Moose Lake, the landscape around I-35 makes a dramatic change. Exposed granite can be seen at the surface, and the deciduous forest changes to evergreens.

I-35 climbs Thompson Hill as it approaches the city of Duluth. As the highway enters the city limits at Boundary Avenue, the Saint Louis Bay and Lake Superior are in view. I-35 then descends Thompson Hill into Duluth, with numerous exits. The freeway has an interchange with I-535/US 53, known locally as the "Can of Worms". The junction features a pair of left exits from I-35, a stoplight, and lane drops over the I-35 bridge.

I-35 then proceeds to downtown Duluth. At this junction where I-35 ends, MN 61 begins its route northeast along the North Shore of Lake Superior.

History

I-35 in Minnesota was authorized as part of the primary Interstate network in 1956. It was mostly constructed in the 1960s. The route in Minnesota replaced portions of old US 61 and old US 65.

I-35 was generally constructed along former routes of US 65 south of the Twin Cities and US 61 north of the Twin Cities.

By 1961, the section of I-35 around Hinckley and Sandstone was under construction.

Three lanes each way have been constructed on I-35 between the I-35E/I-35W split at Columbus to US 8 at Forest Lake. Three lanes have also been constructed on I-35 northbound at Thompson Hill, right before entering the city of Duluth. Additionally, three lanes have been constructed on I-35 southbound in Duluth at Thompson Hill between Central Avenue and US 2 westbound. Three lanes in each direction have also been constructed on I-35 in Duluth between the Can of Worms interchange (I-535/US 53) and the Mesaba Avenue interchange.

From November 1971 to October 1987, the national northern terminus for I-35 was its interchange with Mesaba Avenue in Duluth.

The last section of I-35 in Minnesota to be constructed was around downtown Duluth. The I-35 extension to Lake Avenue in Duluth was open to traffic in October 1987. The temporary I-35 extension to 10th Avenue East in Duluth was open to traffic in November 1989. The I-35 extension to its present-day junction with 26th Avenue East and MN 61 in Duluth was open to traffic in October 1992 after the construction of the Leif Erickson Tunnel. The section marked the final segment of the I-35 to be opened, and one of the last segments of the original Interstate Highway System.

In 2002, all of I-35 in the state of Minnesota, from the Iowa state line to the city of Duluth, was officially designated the Red Bull Highway, after the 34th Infantry (Red Bull) Division, though plans to create signage never came to fruition. In practice, this name is seldom, if ever, used.

Exit list

References

External links

Interstate 35 at the Unofficial Minnesota Highways Page

 Minnesota
35
Transportation in Freeborn County, Minnesota
Transportation in Steele County, Minnesota
Transportation in Rice County, Minnesota
Transportation in Scott County, Minnesota
Transportation in Dakota County, Minnesota
Transportation in Anoka County, Minnesota
Transportation in Washington County, Minnesota
Transportation in Chisago County, Minnesota
Transportation in Pine County, Minnesota
Transportation in Carlton County, Minnesota
Transportation in St. Louis County, Minnesota